See Charles David Liddell and David Liddell-Grainger for similarly named individuals.
Major David Liddell, MC (9 January 1917 in Hankow, China – 20 March 2008) was a Scottish soldier, insurance broker and farmer.

A British Army World War II commander awarded an immediate MC for his outstanding service in Italy while serving with the 12th Battalion Cameronians (Scottish Rifles). On 23 December 1943, he commanded the reinforcements to the Essex 5th Battalion Regiment, which was sent to capture the Italian village of Villa Grande, near Termoli, which was being held by the German 1st Parachute Division.

 While training he was called to assist with the capture of Rudolf Hess who had landed nearby.

Family
His wife was Joan Russell, who represented England at squash. She predeceased him, dying in 2004. Liddell was survived by two sons and a daughter. His brother was Ian Oswald Liddell VC.

References

1917 births
2008 deaths
People educated at Harrow School
British Army personnel of World War II
Scottish farmers
Cameronians officers
20th-century Scottish businesspeople
Place of birth missing
Place of death missing
Recipients of the Military Cross
British expatriates in China